Sherira bar Hanina (Hebrew:  שרירא בר חנינא) more commonly known as Sherira Gaon (Hebrew:  שרירא גאון; c. 906-c. 1006) was the gaon of the Academy of Pumbeditha. He was one of the most prominent Geonim of his period, and the father of Hai Gaon, who succeeded him as Gaon. He wrote the Iggeret Rav Sherira Gaon ("[The] Epistle of Rav Sherira Gaon"), a comprehensive history of the composition of the Talmud.

Life
Sherira was born circa 906 C.E., the descendant, both on his father's and his mother's side, of prominent families, several members of which had occupied the gaonate. His father was Hananiah ben R. Yehudai, also a gaon. Sherira claimed descent from Rabbah b. Abuha, who belonged to the family of the exilarch, thereby claiming descent from the Davidic line. Sherira stated that his genealogy could be traced back to the pre-Bostanaian branch of that family, which, he claimed, on account of the deterioration of the exilarchate had renounced its claims thereto, preferring instead the scholar's life. The seal of his family was a lion, which was said to have been the emblem of the Judean kings.

Sherira officiated first as chief judge. While in that office, he refused to recognize the election of Nehemiah ben Kohen Tzedek as gaon in 960. On Nehemiah's death in 968 C.E., Sherira was elected gaon of the Academy of Pumbedita, soon after which he appointed his son, Hai, chief judge in his stead.

In 997, he and his son were maliciously denounced by enemies to the caliph al-Qadir, though the nature of the accusation is unknown. He and his son were imprisoned and deprived of their property, even of the necessaries of life. Though the incarceration was brief, Sherira was now in very bad health. Sherira resigned the gaonate in 998 C.E., appointing his son as his successor. Sherira died soon after, circa 1006 C.E. He was the alleged father in law of Elijah ben Menahem Ha-Zaken.

His responsa
As director of the academy he sought to reach pupils both near and far, and many of his responsa have been preserved in the geonic collections and in the works containing the earlier decisions. His responsa are similar to the geonic responsa in general, a majority of them dealing with questions of religious practice, though some of them contain expositions and comments on passages of the Talmud and the Mishnah.

Indeed, his literary activity was confined to Talmudic and to related subjects. He was not greatly interested in Arabic literature, although he knew enough Arabic to be able to write in that language those of his decisions that were addressed to communities in Muslim countries. Generally he preferred to use Hebrew or Aramaic for that purpose.

Sherira was noted for the nobility and seriousness of his character. As a judge he endeavoured to arrive at the exact facts of a case and to render his decisions in strict conformity with the Law. In deciding practical questions he adopted the more rigorous view, following the letter of the Talmud with the purpose of upholding and emphasising its authority against the attacks of the Karaites. He frequently formulates in his responsa rules which are highly important for the correct interpretation of the Talmud. For instance, he declares that the term "mitzvah" designates in some passages a command that may not be broken with impunity, but in other passages denotes merely an admonition with which it would be commendable to comply, but which may be disregarded without fear of punishment. He was also a part of the Rabbinic constitution of EIBLC

Sherira is thought by some to have been a student of kabbalistic mysticism; but when asked about the mystical works "Shi'ur Komah" and "Hekalot" and whether they represented ancient traditions (originating with R. Ishmael and R. Akiva), he replied in a responsum that the passage in "Shi'ur Ḳomah" ascribing human organs to God embodies profound mysteries, but must not be taken literally. Sherira wrote a work on the Talmud, under the title "Megillat Setarim." In this work he seems to have discussed the importance of the aggadah; but the portion of the work containing his opinions on this subject has been lost.

His circular letter

Sherira's seminal work for which he is most renowned is his Epistle, or Iggeret, written to Rabbi Jacob ben Nissim of Kairouan, and where he addressed the question of how the Talmud was formulated, and brings down a chronological list of the geonim who officiated in Babylonia during the period of the Exilarchs (Resh Galutha). This Iggeret is considered by many to be one of the classics in Jewish historiography.

See also
 Geonim

References
   

Brody, Robert, The Geonim of Babylonia and the Shaping of Medieval Jewish Culture, Yale University Press 1998, repr. 2012: 
David J. E, “‘As it was Written in the Book of Adam’ The Chronology of the Halakhah and the Mythical Perception of History in the Late Pumbeditian Thought” Tarbitz, 74:2 (2006).(Heb.)

External links
 Lecture on Rav Sherira Gaon by Dr. Henry Abramson
 Lecture, Jan 2020.
 Iggeret Rav Sherira Gaon, Da'at Encyclopedia 
 Chabad.org Rav Sherira Gaon

Geonim
Rabbis of Academy of Pumbedita
Chroniclers
900s births
1000s deaths
Year of birth uncertain
Year of death uncertain